Vöölameri is a lake of Estonia. The area of the lake is 67.7 ha.

See also
List of lakes of Estonia

References

Lakes of Estonia